Jordi Figueras Montel (born 16 May 1987) is a Spanish professional footballer who plays for Algeciras CF as a central defender.

Club career
Born in Lleida, Catalonia, Figueras had an unsuccessful short spell at Real Madrid where he arrived at age 18 from his hometown club UE Lleida, only playing for the C side. He then moved to RC Celta de Vigo, initially being assigned to the reserves.

In the 2009–10 season, Figueras was firmly established in Celta's starting XI, with the Galicians in the Segunda División. However, on 17 February 2010, he was sold to Russia's FC Rubin Kazan for €850,000, joining compatriot César Navas.

Figueras returned to his country in 2010–11, being loaned to second-tier Real Valladolid. In the summer of 2011, he joined Rayo Vallecano on loan for the season.

Figueras made his debut in the Spanish top flight on 28 August 2011, starting in a 1–1 away draw against Athletic Bilbao. He played the full 90 minutes in all the games in the first part of the season but, on 19 January 2012, moved teams and countries again, signing for Club Brugge KV of the Belgian First Division A for four and a half years after successfully passing his medical.

Figueras returned to Spain in January 2013, serving a small loan with Rayo and subsequently joining Real Betis on a permanent basis. He scored once from 25 matches in his debut campaign with the latter, which ended in top-division relegation, then started in all his 39 appearances the following year in an immediate promotion as champions.

On 28 July 2016, following a brief spell in the Turkish Süper Lig with Eskişehirspor, Figueras agreed to a two-year contract with German club Karlsruher SC. He switched to the Indian Super League on 9 September 2017, signing for ATK and being appointed captain following an injury to Robbie Keane.

On 22 June 2018, Figueras returned to his native country and joined Racing de Santander for three years.

Career statistics

Honours
Betis
Segunda División: 2014–15

References

External links

1987 births
Living people
Spanish people of Portuguese descent
Sportspeople from Lleida
Spanish footballers
Footballers from Catalonia
Association football defenders
La Liga players
Segunda División players
Segunda División B players
Tercera División players
Primera Federación players
UE Lleida players
Real Madrid C footballers
Celta de Vigo B players
RC Celta de Vigo players
Real Valladolid players
Rayo Vallecano players
Real Betis players
Racing de Santander players
Algeciras CF footballers
Russian Premier League players
FC Rubin Kazan players
Belgian Pro League players
Club Brugge KV players
Süper Lig players
Eskişehirspor footballers
2. Bundesliga players
Karlsruher SC players
Indian Super League players
ATK (football club) players
Spanish expatriate footballers
Expatriate footballers in Russia
Expatriate footballers in Belgium
Expatriate footballers in Turkey
Expatriate footballers in Germany
Expatriate footballers in India
Spanish expatriate sportspeople in Russia
Spanish expatriate sportspeople in Belgium
Spanish expatriate sportspeople in Turkey
Spanish expatriate sportspeople in Germany
Spanish expatriate sportspeople in India